G. & F. Cope Ltd was a clockmaking company based in Nottingham, England from 1845 to 1984.

History

Two brothers, George and Francis Cope founded the company in 1845. They took over the turret clock business of Reuben Bosworth. (Reuben Bosworth continued to manufacture turret and domestic clocks). 

Their initial factory was in Holden Street and they had offices on Gregory Street then Alfreton Road but in 1937 they moved to Portland Road. In 1945 they moved again to Prospect Place in Lenton, where the company remained until it was absorbed by Smith of Derby Group.

The company was responsible for most of the public clocks in Nottingham, and also many further afield. As innovative manufacturers, the firm produced chronometers for the Admiralty as well as fine tower clocks and chimes.

Owners
George and Francis Cope 1845 – 1899
William Cope 1899 – 1922
William W Cope 1922 – 
Richard Cope and David Cope

Notable Cope Clocks
 

St. Laurence's Church, Norwell
St Swithun's Church, Woodborough 1854 (installed 1856)
St Peter's Church, Nottingham 1850s
Holy Cross Church, Ossington 1860s
St Mary's Church, Ilkeston 1864
All Saints' Church, Cotgrave, 1865
Holy Cross Church, Epperstone 1865
St Michael's Church, Laxton 1865
St Mary's Church, Eastwood 1866
St. Peter and St. Paul's Church, Shelford 1880
Nottingham Exchange 1881, moved to St Helen's Church, Trowell in 1927
St Peter's Church, Nottingham 1881
St Andrew's Church, Eakring, 1887
St Mary's Church, Plumtree 1889 (removed in 2009)
St. Andrew's Church, Langar
St Mary's Church, Keyworth
St. Wilfrid's Church, Kirkby-in-Ashfield 1911
All Saints' Church, Mattersey 1921
All Saints' Church, Rempstone 1920s
St Luke's Church, Shireoaks 
Nottingham Council House 1926 (the loudest clock bell in the United Kingdom)
Lever House, Blackfriars, London
St. Christopher's Church, Sneinton
St Mary's Church, Nottingham 1936  (the first all electric winding and chiming clock produced by the company)
Church of St Mary the Virgin and All Souls, Bulwell 1949
Lewis and Grundy Clock, Victoria Street, Nottingham 1950

References

Companies based in Nottinghamshire
Manufacturing companies established in 1845
Manufacturing companies disestablished in 1984
Engineering companies of the United Kingdom
Clock manufacturing companies of the United Kingdom
Turret clock makers of the United Kingdom